Katunje is a village and former Village Development Committee that is now part of Suryabinayak Municipality in Province No. 3 of central Nepal. At the time of the 2011 Nepal census it had a population of 19,497 with 4,692 houses in it.

Many with surname Dhungel have lived in Katunje for generations. Previously rural, now Katunje has witnessed a housing explosion with extension of the Koteswar Suryabinayak highway into a 6 lane highway.

References

Populated places in Bhaktapur District